The 2015–16 season was Bristol City's 118th season as a professional football club and their first back in the Championship following promotion last season. Along with competing in the Championship, the club also participated in the FA Cup and League Cup. The season covered the period from 1 July 2015 to 30 June 2016.

Squad

Statistics

|-
|colspan=14|First team players out on loan:

|-
|colspan=14|Players who have left the club during the season:

|}

Goals record

Includes one goal in the League

Disciplinary record

Contracts

Transfers

Transfers in

Total spending:  £2,050,000

Transfers out

Loans in

Loans out

Competitions

Pre-season friendlies

Championship

League table

Matches

FA Cup

League Cup

Overall summary

Summary

Score overview

Results by matchday

References

Bristol City
Bristol City F.C. seasons